Shu Chang (born 1 December 1987) is a Chinese actress, singer, and television host. In the early 2000s, Shu gained considerable fame for her roles as Consort Donggo in Xiaozhuang Mishi (2003); Jin Meili in The Story of a Noble Family (2003); Tianshan Tonglao in Demi-Gods and Semi-Devils (2003); Princess Yun in Huang Taizi Mishi (2004); Shui Sheng in A Deadly Secret (2004); Jingwei in Jingwei Tianhai (2004) and Xiaoyu in Lotus Lantern (2005).

Biography
Despite her busy schedule, Shu has never neglected her studies. She was awarded the "merit award for all-round development" for good students from 1995 to 1999, and also the "Red Scarf Model" and the "Top 10 Outstanding Youths" accolades from the Beijing government. When she was in secondary school, Shu maintained the top student position for three consecutive years.

Shu graduated from Beijing International Studies University.

Career

Early beginnings
When Shu Chang was still a child, she was discovered by a director in a photo-taking center and invited to guest-star as the younger version of the female protagonist in My Story. Thereafter she has constantly appeared in television series. In 1995, she was awarded the 'Golden Child' award by the State Administration of Press, Publication, Radio, Film and Television. She also appeared in the music video of "Que Ga Fei", a popular children's song that won the Gold award at the Chinese Music Television Festival and won the award of honorary mentions. In 1996, Shu released her first single "On the Way Home".

Shu gained attention for her role in the television series in Single Household (1997). At the age of 10, Shu released her first album Have a love to Home which serves as the soundtrack for Single Household. The album sold 100,000 copies and caused a huge stir in the music industry at that time. Shu also became the host for the children's variety program Dragon Club (1998). From 1995 to 2001, Shu attended various events where she hosted, sang or performed in stage productions. She has also appeared in television series and films throughout this period.

Rising popularity
Shu rose to fame for her role as the gentle and elegant Consort Donggo in Xiaozhuang Epic (2002), and won the Outstanding Newcomer Award at the China Golden Eagle TV Art Festival.

In 2003, Shu appeared in two popular television series; period romance drama The Story of a Noble Family and wuxia drama Demi-Gods and Semi-Devils. In particular, her role as Tianshan Tonglao left a deep impression on the audience, and led to increased recognition for Shu. Also due to the success of The Story of a Noble Family (the writer was from Fenghuang County, Hunan), Shu, along with other major cast members, were designated as "Honorary Citizens" of Fenghuang County.

In 2004, Shu starred in The Deadly Secret, based on the novel of the same name by Jin Yong. During the filming of the series, Shu was faced with a life-threatening accident and even had to sign an indemnity agreement. She also starred in Huang Taizi Epic; the second installment of the historical series after Xiaozhuang Epic.

In 2005, Shu starred in the fantasy drama Lotus Lantern. The series was the highest rated drama of the year and won the Best Television Series award at the Asian Television Awards. Following its airing, Shu experienced a surge in popularity and was known by wider audiences. The same year, Shu was also cast in the mythological-fantasy drama Jing Wei Zhen Hai, based on the Classic of Mountains and Seas wherein she portrayed Jingwei.

Career slump
However, in 2006, Shu was involved in a contract dispute lawsuit against the production team of San Di Xue, reaching the nadir of her career. She was accused of being absent from the shooting location for an extended period, and was discovered to be at different locations filming other productions at the same time. Shu responded to the accusation, saying that the other party breached the terms of the contract first and divulged her personal details to the media.

Career resurgence and supporting roles
Shu bounced back in 2008 with her role in fantasy web series Magic Phone as a technologically-challenged woman from the future. The series attained a peak rating of 5.76 for a single episode, and went on to receive the "Most Popular Television Series" award at the Baidu Fudian award ceremony. She also co-starred in Royal Tramp, where she received positive reviews for her portrayal of the sassy and forthright Princess Jianning. Shu received the Breakthrough Actor award at the Tencent Star Awards Ceremony.

She starred in the 2011 'television adaptation of Journey to the West, playing Ruler of Women's Kingdom. In 2012, she starred in the second installment of the Yu Zheng's 'Gong' series, playing twin sisters; and received praises for her performance.

In 2013, Shu played the lead in the period political drama Beauties at the Crossfire, which achieved the highest ratings of the year for Anhui TV and won the Most Popular Television Series award at the Shanghai Television Festival.

Since then, Shu played notable supporting roles in the popular television series Legend of Fragrance (2015), Noble Aspirations (2016) and The Glory of Tang Dynasty (2017).

Filmography

Film

Television series

Discography

Albums

Singles

References

External links
  

20th-century Chinese actresses
21st-century Chinese actresses
Beijing International Studies University people
Chinese child actresses
Chinese television presenters
1987 births
Living people
Actresses from Jilin
People from Baishan
Chinese film actresses
Chinese television actresses
21st-century Chinese women singers
Chinese women television presenters